Arod or A-Rod may refer to:

 Arod (biblical figure) or Arodi, a son of Gad in the Bible
 A-Rod (Alex Rodriguez, born 1975), American Major League Baseball player
 A-Rod (Aaron Rodgers, born 1983), American National Football League quarterback
 A-Rod (Amy Rodriguez, born 1987), American soccer player
 A-Rod (Andy Roddick, born 1982), American tennis player